Deycimont is a commune in the Vosges department in Grand Est in northeastern France. The residents are known as Rouges-Fournants ("Red Oveners")

Geography
In the Vologne valley, between Lépanges and Docelles, Deycimont is built under the Recreux mountain. The brooks la Bouillante and le Rupt du Void go through the village.

The two main hamlets which depend on Deycimont are le Faing Vairel and la Haute Verrière.

Several farms and a weaving factory can be found there, as in the whole region.

History

The name of Deycimont has been known since 1232 but there certainly were some houses in the Antiquity, because old Celtic and Roman coins have been found. The name of the town could mean "Decius Mountain".

The church, dedicated to Sainte Menne, was first built between 1050 and 1080 by the bishop of Toul. It was rebuilt in 1711.

Population
The village, like many others, suffered during the Thirty Years' War.  During this period, more than three-quarters of the population perished.  By the end of the war, in 1648, the population had dwindled to 20 inhabitants.  However, the population rebounded significantly over the subsequent fifty years, reaching pre-war levels.

During the eighteenth century, the population increased dramatically, from around 100 in 1708 to well over 300 in 1806.  This period of growth was followed by a mild decline in the twentieth century.  However, there has been renewed growth in the early part of the twenty-first century.

Personalities

Jean Hubert Houël was born in Deycimont on April 4, 1802 and died in Saint-Dié on October 20, 1889. He was among the members imprisoned after the coup of December 2, 1851 after signing the letters of impeachment against President Louis-Napoléon Bonaparte.  He gave up politics after this short detention.

See also
 Communes of the Vosges department

References

Communes of Vosges (department)